The Diocese of San Isidro de El General ( is a Latin Church ecclesiastical territory or diocese of the Catholic Church in Costa Rica. It is a suffragan diocese in the ecclesiastical province of the metropolitan Archdiocese of San José de Costa Rica. It was erected as a diocese on 19 August 1954.

Bishops

Ordinaries
Delfín Quesada Castro (1954−1974)
Ignacio Nazareno Trejos Picado (1974−2003)
Guillermo Loría Garita (2003−2013)
Gabriel Enrique Montero Umaña, O.F.M. Conv. (2013–2021)
Juan Miguel Castro Rojas (2021–present)

Other priest of this diocese who became bishop
Hugo Barrantes Ureña, appointed Bishop of Puntarenas in 1998

Territorial losses

References

External links
 

San Isidro de El General
San Isidro de El General
San Isidro de El General